Kosiba is a surname. Notable people with the surname include:

 Aleksander Kosiba (1901–1981), Polish geophysicist
 Kamil Kosiba (born 1999), Polish volleyball player
 Piotr Kosiba (1855–1939), Polish Roman Catholic friar

See also
 

Polish-language surnames